Middle Taphouse (or Mid Taphouse) is a hamlet in east Cornwall, England, about  west of Liskeard along the A390 road. It consists of a small group of bungalows and houses. Hillball Wood is immediately east of the hamlet, and further woodland lies to the north. The hamlet of West Taphouse is a little further west along the A390 and the small village of East Taphouse is further east. The Western Greyhound 575 bus service between St Neot and Liskeard stops at Middle Taphouse.

References

Hamlets in Cornwall